Prairie Knights Casino and Resort is a casino and lodge located near Fort Yates, North Dakota, on the Standing Rock Indian Reservation and about 50 miles south of Bismarck-Mandan. It is operated by the Standing Rock Indian Tribe. The casino offers high stakes gaming options, along with 725 slot machines, blackjack, craps, among other games. The lodge portion of the casino consists of 200 guest rooms.  Prairie Knights is also home to an entertainment pavilion that sees about 15 music concerts every year.

References

External links

 Prairie Knights Casino and Resort website

Casinos in North Dakota
Buildings and structures in Sioux County, North Dakota
Tourist attractions in Sioux County, North Dakota
Native American casinos
Casino hotels
Standing Rock Sioux Tribe